John Junior "Champ" Summers (June 15, 1946 – October 11, 2012) was a Major League Baseball outfielder and first baseman for six teams during his eleven-year career that spanned from 1974 to 1984. Summers played with the Oakland Athletics, Chicago Cubs, Cincinnati Reds, Detroit Tigers, San Francisco Giants and San Diego Padres.

Early career
Summers, who was born in Bremerton, Washington, served in the United States Army in the Vietnam War and was a recipient of the Purple Heart, did not play his first Major League Baseball game until he was 28 years old. He was signed by the Oakland Athletics as an amateur free agent in 1971, after being discovered in a men's softball league following his service in Vietnam.

Summers came from a family of athletes, with a father who was a prizefighter in the United States Navy and a mother who was a pro bowler. Summers received his nickname "Champ" from his father: "Dad took one look at me when I was born and said, 'He looks like he's just gone 10 rounds with Joe Louis.'"

Summers played two years of basketball and one of baseball at Southern Illinois University Edwardsville before leaving for his professional baseball career. He is a member of SIUE's Athletics Hall of Fame.

Professional career
Summers bounced between the minors and majors, mostly as a pinch hitter, until Sparky Anderson brought him to Detroit as a designated hitter.

Champ's best seasons were 1979 and 1980, when he hit 38 of his 54 career home runs and 121 of his 218 career RBIs. In 1979, he hit a career high 21 home runs, batted .291 with a .401 on-base percentage and a .556 slugging percentage for a .956 OPS. Summers had five RBIs in a single game in May 1979. In 1980, he had another big year, batting .297 with a .393 on-base percentage, .504 slugging percentage and .897 OPS. Summers performance dropped off substantially in 1981, batting .255 with only 3 home runs.

On March 4, 1982, the Tigers traded Champ to the San Francisco Giants for Enos Cabell and cash. After two seasons with the Giants, he was traded to the San Diego Padres, where he played his final season in 1984.  Summers only hit .185 for the 1984 National League Champion San Diego Padres, mostly as a pinch hitter (36 of his 54 at bats came off the bench).  But Summers' biggest hit of the season was a pinch-hit grand slam on April 10, 1984, off of St. Louis Cardinals right-hander Bob Forsch propelling the Padres to a 7–3 victory en route to a sizzling 10–2 start and runaway capture of club's first division title.

While with the Padres, Summers was one of the central figures in a series of bench-clearing brawls in a game at Atlanta on August 12. At one point, Summers charged toward the Braves dugout looking to take on pitcher Pascual Pérez, who had hit the Padres' Alan Wiggins in the first inning, although Perez had been brushed back by San Diego pitchers Ed Whitson and Craig Lefferts while at bat. Summers was intercepted by injured Atlanta slugger Bob Horner and tackled by Horner and two fans that claimed Champ had made indecent remarks to them in the parking lot.

Summers ended his career playing for the Padres in the 1984 World Series against his former skipper, Sparky Anderson, and his former Detroit Tigers teammates.  Summers struck out in his only at bat in the 1984 World Series, which also wound up being his last major league at bat.

Over his eleven-year career, Summers hit for a .255 batting average with 54 home runs and 218 RBIs.

Summers died in Ocala, Florida at age 66 of kidney cancer. He was buried at the Florida National Cemetery in Bushnell, Florida.

References

External links

, or SABR Biography Project

1946 births
2012 deaths
Baseball players from Washington (state)
Burials at Florida National Cemetery
Burlington Bees players
Chicago Cubs players
Cincinnati Reds players
Coos Bay-North Bend A's players
Deaths from cancer in Florida
Deaths from kidney cancer
Detroit Tigers players
Fort Myers Sun Sox players
Indianapolis Indians players
Major League Baseball outfielders
Minor league baseball managers
New York Yankees coaches
Nicholls Colonels baseball players
Nicholls State University alumni
Oakland Athletics players
People from Bremerton, Washington
San Diego Padres players
San Francisco Giants players
SIU Edwardsville Cougars baseball players
SIU Edwardsville Cougars men's basketball players
Sportspeople from Ocala, Florida
Tucson Toros players
American Association (1902–1997) MVP Award winners
United States Army personnel of the Vietnam War
American men's basketball players